Schmidt & Pocher was a German late-night talk show hosted on Das Erste by comedians Harald Schmidt and Oliver Pocher in the Thursday 10:45 pm time slot from 25 October 2007 to 16 April 2009. It was the successor of Harald Schmidt on the same network.

Music 
The house band was led by Helmut Zerlett.
 Helmut Zerlett – keyboards
 Axel Heilhecker – guitars
 Rosko Gee – bass
 Antoine Fillon – drums
 Jürgen Dahmen – piano
 Thomas Heberer – trumpets
 Mel Collins – saxophone

References

External links

German television talk shows
Das Erste original programming
Television shows set in Cologne
2007 German television series debuts
2009 German television series endings
German-language television shows